"Break 4 Love" is a song written, produced and recorded by Vaughan Mason, the principal member of American house music group Raze, the song's original credited performer. The song, the group's only significant US hit, featured vocals by Keith Thompson and Vaughan Mason, as well as sexual sound samples by Erique Dial. The single peaked at number 28 on the UK Singles Chart and topped the US Billboard Hot Dance Club Play chart in 1988. It is still considered a classic of the early house music genre.

The song interpolates "Today, Tomorrow and Forever" (1987) by The Castle Beat.

Versions

Original 1988–1989 versions
 "Break 4 Love" (Drop the Panties) – a.k.a. Caught in the Act Mix – spoken vocals by Vaughan Mason
 "Break 4 Love" (Radio Vocals) – a.k.a. English Mix, English Version, Vaughan Mason 12" Mix – sung vocals by Keith Thompson
 "Break 4 Love" (Instrumental)
 "Break 4 Love" (Spanish Fly) – spoken vocals by Jeanette Fraginals
 "Break 4 Love" (Spanish Mix) – similar to Spanish Fly, but no break
 "Break 4 Love" (French Mix)
 "Break 4 Love" (Italian Mix)
All of these versions run approximately 5:25 and feature sexual vocalization samples by Erique Dial.
A 3:18 edit of the English Mix was used as the 7" single version.

Commercial performance and reissues
"Break 4 Love" reached number 28 on the UK Singles Chart in 1988. It has since been remixed, re-recorded and reissued on several different independent dance music labels, the most significant of which, "All 4 Love (Break 4 Love 1990)" which featured Lady J and The Secretary of Entertainment and produced and co-written by Erique Dial climbed to number 30 in the UK in early 1990. Further releases of "Break 4 Love" remixes were released in the UK in 1994 and 2003. The 1994 release reached number 44 on the UK Singles Chart and number one on the UK Dance Singles Chart, and the 2003 release at number 64 on the singles chart.

Impact and legacy
British drum and bass DJ and producer Fabio chose "Break 4 Love" as one of his top 10 tracks in 1996, saying, "This was one of the first breakbeat tracks. It used the break to roll the track along. A really sexy track, it always gets people going mad—it's got energy."

"Break 4 Love" can be heard in the video game Grand Theft Auto: San Andreas, on the in-game radio station SF-UR, which also features other house music songs by different artists.

Track listing
Original Groove Street 12-inch single
"Break 4 Love" (Drop the Panties)
"Break 4 Love" (Instrumental)
"Break 4 Love" (Spanish Fly)
"Break 4 Love" (Radio Vocals)

Charts

The Collaboration version

"Break 4 Love" was covered by Peter Rauhofer and Pet Shop Boys, released under the name "Peter Rauhofer + Pet Shop Boys = The Collaboration". The single was not released in the United Kingdom and did not chart there. The song can be found on the US bonus disc of the Pet Shop Boys album Release and as a B-side to CD 2 of their single, "Home and Dry".

The single did not chart on the US Billboard Hot 100, but it peaked at number one on the Hot Dance Club Play chart, and peaked at number 51 on the US Hot Singles Sales chart.

Track listings
US 12-inch single: Star 69
 "Break 4 Love" (USA Club Mix)
 "Break 4 Love" (Friburn and Urik Tribal Mix)
 "Break 4 Love" (Mike Monday's Kit Kat Dub)
 "Break 4 Love" (The Classic Mix)

US CD single part 1: Star 69 (CD12172)
 "Break 4 Love" (UK Radio Mix)
 "Break 4 Love" (US Radio Mix)
 "Break 4 Love" (Classic Radio Mix)
 "Break 4 Love" (Friburn and Urik Tribal Mix)
 "Break 4 Love" (USA Club Mix)
 "Break 4 Love" (Mike Monday Kit Kat Dub)
 "Break 4 Love" (Classic Club Mix)
 "Break 4 Love" (Ralphie's Dub for Love)

US CD single part 2: Star 69 (CD12192)
 "Break 4 Love" (Laroz and Amdursky Mix)
 "Break 4 Love" (Friburn and Urik Hi-Pass Mix)
 "Break 4 Love" (Michael Moog Club Mix)
 "Break 4 Love" (Richard Morel's Pink Noize Club Mix)
 "Break 4 Love" (Sunshi Moriwaki's 2 Step Remix)
 "Break 4 Love" (Michael Moog Dub)

Charts

References

1987 songs
1988 singles
2001 singles
Champion Records singles
Columbia Records singles
Music Week number-one dance singles
Pet Shop Boys songs
Raze (group) songs